Annie Neal Graham was the first African-American female to enlist in the United States Marine Corps. She enlisted on 8 September 1949.

References

External links
USMC History Division Who's Who

Female United States Marine Corps personnel